Léon François Larive (28 June 1886 – 20 July 1961) was a French film actor. He appeared in more than 90 films between 1923 and 1961.

Selected filmography

 Two Timid Souls (1928)
 The Great Passion (1928)
 La Passion de Jeanne d'Arc (1928)
 The Wonderful Day (1929)
 All That's Not Worth Love (1931)
 Zero for Conduct (1933)
 Casanova (1934)
 The Typist Gets Married (1934)
 Madame Bovary (1934)
Bach the Detective (1936)
 Girls of Paris (1936)
 The Tale of the Fox (1937)
 Claudine at School (1937)
 The Little Thing (1938)
 The Novel of Werther (1938)
 Rasputin (1938)
 The Train for Venice (1938)
 The Rules of the Game (1939)
 The White Slave (1939)
 Sacred Woods (1939)
 Cristobal's Gold (1940)
 Strange Inheritance (1943)
 The Bellman (1945)
 François Villon (1945)
 Return to Life (1949)
 Doctor Laennec (1949)
 The Voyage to America (1951)
 When You Read This Letter (1953)
 I'll Get Back to Kandara (1956)

References

External links

1886 births
1961 deaths
French male film actors
French male silent film actors
Male actors from Paris
20th-century French male actors